A Black Box is the ninth studio album by Peter Hammill, originally released on S-Type Records in August 1980.

Hammill performed nearly all the instrumentation himself, including the drum parts, a task he had first undertaken on his previous album pH7. His ex-Van der Graaf Generator colleague David Jackson also made a guest appearance, along with David Ferguson of the new-wave band Random Hold, whose debut album Hammill had produced.

Side 1 of the record featured a collection of songs, while side 2 was devoted to "Flight", a lengthy multi-section song. This was the first time Hammill had included a lengthy song of this type on one of his solo albums.

The short-lived S-Type label (the name was a pun on "stereo-type"), on which the album was originally released, was set up by Hammill and his then manager Gail Colson. Colson had formerly been a director at Hammill's previous record company, Charisma Records, who had dropped him from their roster just prior to the recording of A Black Box. The S-Type label does not appear to have been a successful business project, and the album was later licensed to Virgin Records, who have since also acquired Hammill's Charisma catalogue.

Track listing 
All songs written by Peter Hammill, except where noted.

Personnel 
Peter Hammill – vocals, guitar, keyboards, drums, bass
David Jackson – saxophone, flute on 4 and 8
David Ferguson – synthesizer and tambourine on 4, 6 and 7

Technical 
Peter Hammill - recording engineer (Sofa Sound, Wiltshire)
David Lord – mixing (Crescent Studios, Bath)

References

Peter Hammill albums
1980 albums